Éric Pécout (born 17 February 1956) is a retired football striker from France who obtained 5 caps (one goal) for the France national team.

Titles
French championship in 1977, 1980 with FC Nantes, 1982 with AS Monaco
Coupe de France in 1979 with FC Nantes (where he scored a record of 3 goals in final); in 1984 with FC Metz

References
 French Football Federation Profile 
 Stats
 Profile at pari-et-gagne.com

External links
 
 

1956 births
Living people
Sportspeople from Blois
French footballers
France international footballers
Association football forwards
FC Nantes players
AS Monaco FC players
FC Metz players
RC Strasbourg Alsace players
Stade Malherbe Caen players
Tours FC players
Ligue 1 players
Olympic footballers of France
Footballers at the 1976 Summer Olympics
Paris Saint-Germain F.C. non-playing staff
Footballers from Centre-Val de Loire